The men's doubles badminton tournament at the 2020 Summer Olympics took place from 24 to 31 July at the Musashino Forest Sport Plaza at Tokyo. There were 16 pairs from 14 nations competing.

Background
This was the 8th appearance of the event as a full medal event. Badminton was introduced as a demonstration sport in 1972, held again as an exhibition sport in 1988, and added to the full programme in 1992; the men's doubles tournament has been held since.

The reigning champions were Fu Haifeng and Zhang Nan of China, who were not defending their title. Fu retired after the 2016 Games, having reached three consecutive finals with two different partners (Zhang and Cai Yun) and winning two gold medals and a silver medal. The top two qualifying teams were both from Indonesia: Marcus Fernaldi Gideon/Kevin Sanjaya Sukamuljo and Mohammad Ahsan/Hendra Setiawan. The latter pair were also reigning world champions from the 2019 BWF World Championships.

Qualification

The badminton qualification system provided for 16 men's doubles teams (32 players). Following revisions due to the COVID-19 pandemic, the qualifying periods were set from 29 April 2019 to 15 March 2020 and from 4 January to 13 June 2021, with the ranking list of 15 June 2021 deciding qualification.

Qualification was done entirely through the ranking list. Nations with at least two pairs in the top 8 were able to send a maximum of 2 pairs (4 players); all other nations were limited to a single pair. Pairs were taken from the ranking list in order, respecting those national limits, until 16 pairs were selected. However, each continent was guaranteed to have at least one pair with the lowest-ranking pairs displaced if necessary to make room for a continental guarantee.

Competition format
The tournament was started with a group phase round-robin. There were four groups of four teams each; the top two highest-ranked pairs from each group advanced to the knockout stage. The knockout stage was a three-round single-elimination tournament with a bronze medal match.

Matches were played best-of-three games. Each game was played to 21, except that a pair must win by 2 unless the score reached 30–29.

Seeds
 (quarter-finals)
 (fourth place)
 (silver medalists)
 (quarter-finals)

Schedule
The tournament was held over an 8-day period, with 7 competition days and 1 open day.

Group stage

Group A

Group B

Group C

Group D

Finals
The quarter-finals were held on 29 July 2021, the semi-finals on the next day, and the medal matches on 31 July 2021.

References

External links
Group play 

Badminton at the 2020 Summer Olympics
Men's events at the 2020 Summer Olympics